Amkuna is a village of Bangladesh. It is in Uttar Bade Pasha Union, Golapganj Upazila of Sylhet District.

Geography 

Demographics 
As of the 1991 Bangladesh census, Amkuna village has a population of around 5000. Males constitute 50.29% of the population, and females 49.71%. Amkuna village has an average literacy rate of 36.7% (7+ years), and the national average of 32.4% literate.

See also
Uttar Bade Pasha

References

Golapganj Upazila